Kaaneen - A Secret Search (Assamese: কানীন) is an Assamese language feature film written by Rita Chowdhury and directed by Monjul Baruah and starring Jahanara Begum, Baharul Islam, Partha Hazarika, etc. The story of the film is based on the 2007 Assamese novel Rajib Ishwar by Rita Chowdhury. This the second feature film by the director after Antareen.(2017)

Kaaneen - A Secret Search won the Silver Camera Award at 2nd Guwahati International Film Festival 2018. Kaaneen - A Secret Search was screened at the Bangla Axomiya Film Festival 2018, New Delhi and 4th Northeast Film Festival, Pune 2019.

Cast 

 Jahanara Begum as Mandira Baruah
 Baharul Islam as IGP Abhijit Baruah
 Partha Hazarika as Rajib
 Jolly Bhattacharyya as Mandira's mother
 Rahul Gautam Sarma as Abhi
 Kasvi Sarma as Rashmi
 Dhananjay Devnath as Dey Babu
 Mintu Baruah as Mandira's father
 Prankrishna Mahanta as Mandira's uncle
 Purnima Pathak Saikia as warden
 Nirod Choudhury as Mr. Chakraborty
 Ronal Hussain
 Manoj Gogoi 
 Disha Saikia 
 Popi Kakoti 
 Abatosh Bhuyan
 Nayan Jyoti Gogoi

Story line 
The chance encounter with some onlookers crowding an abandoned infant on the roadside leads a wife of a high-ranking police officer track down her similarly abandoned child. The stumbles and the predicaments in her that search fail to deter her and she finds herself on the threshold of uniting with her offspring.

Synopsis 
A chance incidence of coming across an abandoned newborn baby amidst a crowd of curious on-lookers on the side of the road sets in chaotic motion the apparently fulfilled life of Mandira, the housewife of a high-ranking police officer. She makes up her mind and takes the baby to the hospital. But the attending doctors' casual chat between themselves recalls in her mind the buried memories of her own baby from a premarital encounter and she becomes anxious to get back her abandoned child of whose whereabouts or fate she knows nothing. While her high social situation encumbers her efforts to track down her child, the primordial mother in her overrides all the inhibitions and hindrances and finally she meets him in his modest shanty-like accommodation. She finds her child who is now a grow-up young man, living with an aged widow, who used to work at an orphanage and whom her son addresses as mother. The sense of guilt and a mother's love for her child in Mandira makes her overlook the young man's gruff impolite attitude towards her as though she's guilty of the angst in the young man's mind. Mandira desperately wants to get her son back in her life as the shadow of past guilt keeps shrieking in her conscience, while the incompatible differences between her world and that of the young man looms in the backdrop.

Accolades 
 Silver Camera Award at 2nd Guwahati International Film Festival 2018.
 Special Jury Mention Award for supporting role to Partha Hazarika at 2nd Guwahati International Film Festival 2018.

References 

2018 films
2010s Assamese-language films